Houston Wire & Cable Company is a wire and cable provider in the United States. The company was founded in 1975 and based in Houston, Texas. As of year 2011, the company provides service to about 6,000 customers with a customer base covering the industries of communications, energy, engineering, utility and transportation. It was ranked in list of Top 200 Best Small Companies in America in 2009 by Forbes The market capitalization of company is $240.05 million with an enterprise value() of $278.93 million. In February, 2014, the company joined Affiliated Distributors (AD), a dynamic community of independent distributors and manufacturers of construction and industrial products. In 2021 the company was acquired by Omni Cable LLC.

History
The company was founded in 1975. In 1987, it completed its first initial public offering and was subsequently purchased in 1989 by ALLTEL Corporation. 

In 1997, the company was purchased by investment funds affiliated with Code, Hennessy & Simmons LLC, and then conducted a second public offering in 2006. 

In 2010, the company acquired Southwest Wire Rope, LLP and Southern Wire, LLC to broaden its product line. 

In February, 2014, it opened its newest distribution center in Odessa, Texas. The center can provide the customer with standard same-day shipment and will-call pickup in Odessa.

References
Notes

External links
// Official website

Business services companies established in 1975
Companies based in Houston
Companies formerly listed on the Nasdaq
1975 establishments in Texas
American companies established in 1975